Haggis pakora is a Scottish snack food that combines traditional Scottish haggis ingredients with the spices, batter and preparation method of Indian and Pakistani pakoras. It has become a popular food in Indian and Pakistani restaurants in Scotland, and is also available in prepared form in supermarkets.

Origins

Haggis pakora has been described as a "highly improbable Indo-Caledonian alliance making use of the Scots' most potent culinary weapons: sheep pluck (heart, liver and lungs) and deep-fat frying." It has more fondly been called "an inspired example of Indo-Gael fusion". Haggis pakoras are just one of the many haggis fusion foods that have arisen in recent years. Others include haggis samosas, haggis spring rolls, haggis lasagna and haggis quesadillas. Often these use vegetarian haggis rather than the traditional haggis made from a sheep's stomach stuffed with the chopped up lung, heart and liver of the sheep mixed with oatmeal.

The dish appears to have been the creation of the Sikh community during a Scottish Mela held at the SEC in 1992–3, where, with collaboration with the Exec. Chef at the time Bill McMeekin, he was asked for ideas on how to combine Scottish produce and Indian culinary influences. During some practical experiments, it was found that haggis could be used in the same way as other pakora ingredients. Haggis pakoras have become popular appetizers in Indian restaurants in Scotland, where they appeal to what an English food writer (Felicity Cloake) sneeringly described as “the Scottish predilection for deep-frying anything that will stay still long enough to be dunked in batter”. In 2013, it was reported that a Greenock meat products company had launched prepared haggis pakoras. The product had won the  Best Innovative Product prize at the BPEX Foodservice Awards 2013. The Scottish celebrity chef Tony Singh served haggis pakora at a pop-up restaurant during the 2015 Edinburgh Festival.

Preparation

The haggis is cooked in its skin in the normal way. The skin is discarded and the contents (meat, oats, etc.) broken up with a fork.
The mixture may be spiced with ginger, cumin seeds, coriander seeds, turmeric and garam masala.
A thick batter is made of gram flour, chili powder, cumin, salt, yogurt and lemon juice.
The meat is shaped into balls, coated with the batter and then deep fried in oil.
The pakora is fried for 3–4 minutes, and is ready when the batter is crisp and golden.

Haggis pakoras may be served with a dipping sauce made of chopped tomatoes, ketchup, cayenne, paprika, chili sauce, lemon juice and beef stock.
They may also be served with a creamy yogurt sauce.
Haggis pakoras may also be made from vegetarian haggis, and may be served with mango chutney in place of the dipping sauce.
Another variant places vegetarian haggis inside mushroom caps, which are then battered and fried as before.

Notes

See also

List of deep fried foods
List of Indian dishes
List of Pakistani dishes

References

Sources

Scottish cuisine
Deep fried foods
British snack foods
Pakora, haggis